NGC 3868 is a lenticular galaxy located about 300 million light-years away in the constellation Leo. NGC 3868 was discovered by astronomer Édouard Stephan on March 23, 1884. It is a member of the Leo Cluster.

See also
 List of NGC objects (3001–4000)

References

External links

3868
36638
Leo (constellation)
Leo Cluster
Astronomical objects discovered in 1884
Lenticular galaxies